William Aloysius "Blondie" Purcell (born March 16, 1854) was an American Major League Baseball player born in Paterson, New Jersey. He played for nine different major league teams from 1879 to 1890. Purcell played mainly as an outfielder, and he was also a pitcher in 79 games.

Career
On June 6, 1882, while playing for the Buffalo Bisons, Purcell was fined $10 ($ today) for slicing open a soggy baseball. He did this to compel the umpire to put a fresh ball in play so his pitcher, Pud Galvin, would be able to throw his curveball.

Purcell was the first player to get a hit and also score a run in Philadelphia Phillies franchise history, doing so in his first at bat of the 1883 season.

In 1883, Purcell was the player-manager for the Philadelphia Quakers, the team later known as the Phillies. He took the reins of the team after 17 games, when they were only 4–13 under player-manager Bob Ferguson, and finished the season with a dismal 17–81 record. The eighth-place Quakers finished 23 games behind the seventh-place Detroit Wolverines. Purcell never managed again in the major leagues.

Purcell finished his professional baseball career with the ill-fated 1890 Philadelphia Athletics. In 1,097 career games, he had 1,217 hits and a .267 batting average. As a pitcher, he had a win–loss record of 15–43.

Purcell ran a bookmaking operation during his playing career and continued to do so afterwards. It is not known when, where, or if he died.

See also
List of Major League Baseball player-managers

References

External links

1854 births
19th-century baseball players
Major League Baseball outfielders
Major League Baseball player-managers
Syracuse Stars (NL) players
Cincinnati Reds (1876–1879) players
Cleveland Blues (NL) players
Buffalo Bisons (NL) players
Philadelphia Quakers players
Philadelphia Quakers managers
Philadelphia Athletics (AA) players
Boston Beaneaters players
Baltimore Orioles (AA) players
Minor league baseball managers
Binghamton Crickets (1870s) players
Buffalo (minor league baseball) players
Utica (minor league baseball) players
Atlanta Atlantas players
Baseball players from Paterson, New Jersey
Sportspeople from Paterson, New Jersey
Year of death missing